Oleg Zhivetin  (born 18 March 1964) is a Russian painter born in Tashkent (now the capital of Uzbekistan).

At the Surikov Art Institute of Moscow Zhivetin earned a bachelor's degree in Fine Art in 1988, and a Master of Fine Arts degree in Painting and Monumental Art in 1990.

His paintings include a number of public art monuments on display in Russian cities. After a Californian art dealer expressed interest in his work, Zhivetin came to the United States and soon secured a solo show at the Mission San Juan Capistrano museum, and came to be represented by the Rosovsky Gallery in Laguna Beach, California. His work has appeared in Southwest Art and in other visual-art periodicals.

References

External links
Oleg Zhivetin: Turning Icons into Art

1964 births
Artists from Tashkent
20th-century Russian painters
Russian male painters
21st-century Russian painters
Uzbekistani diaspora
Uzbekistani emigrants to the United States
Uzbekistani painters
Living people
20th-century Russian male artists
21st-century Russian male artists